Purewell is an area of Christchurch, Dorset.

History 
St John's Mission Church was built in 1880–81 at the expense of Miss Mary Long.

In 2020, Purewell lost their Post Office.

Politics 
Purewell and Stanpit elected two councillors to Christchurch Borough Council until 2019. It is now part of Bournemouth, Christchurch and Poole.

Purewell is part of the Christchurch parliamentary constituency for elections to the House of Commons. It is currently represented by Conservative MP Christopher Chope.

References 

Areas of Christchurch, Dorset